This is a list of mountains in the Valencian Community of Spain.

See also
List of mountains in Aragon
List of mountains in Catalonia
Sistema Ibérico
Catalan Mediterranean System
Prebaetic System

Sources 
 VV.AA.(1999), Atlas Escolar del País Valencià, PUV (València), 50 pàg.
 ICV, Institut Cartogràfic Valencià.
Topònims
Auditoria Ambiental. Vol I

External links

 Mountains in the Land of Valencia

Valencian Community